Artzooka! is a German-Canadian TV series, and is a co-production between CCI Entertainment and MotionWorks, with support from Nickelodeon Germany and produced in association with the Canadian Broadcasting Corporation. The original Canadian English version is hosted by Jeremie Saunders. Reruns were broadcast on the Qubo television network from June 30, 2012 (alongside Taste Buds, Jakers! The Adventures of Piggley Winks and Harry and His Bucket Full of Dinosaurs) to May 31, 2015. Reruns were aired once more from September 28, 2015 to March 24, 2017, then again from January 6, 2018 to March 25, 2018.

Premise
Each episode would revolve around something, which would inspire the host, Jeremie Saunders, to do an art project about the episode's topic. While doing the art project, he would show viewers the steps to do the art project.

Segments
 Make Idea
 Art? (1)
 Silly What?
 Lights Camera Artzooka!/Make Art Idea
 Art? (2)
 Drawing Idea (Episode Used In Secret Hiding Place, Photos and Celebrating Art)
 Paper Bag Movie
 An Artzooka! Challenge
 Art? (3)
 Make Craft Idea
 Artzooka Safety Message
 Drawing Idea
 An Artzooka! Challenge Movie

References

2010s Canadian children's television series
2010 Canadian television series debuts
2012 Canadian television series endings
2010 German television series debuts
2012 German television series endings
Television series about art
CBC Kids original programming
English-language television shows
Canadian children's education television series